Mirosław Tomasz Tomasik (born 26 May 1965) is a Polish former ice hockey player. He played for Podhale Nowy Targ, Kristianstads IK, and Unia Oświęcim during his career. He also played for the Polish national team at the 1992 Winter Olympics and multiple World Championships.

References

External links
 

1965 births
Living people
Ice hockey players at the 1992 Winter Olympics
Kristianstads IK players
Olympic ice hockey players of Poland
People from Skawina
Podhale Nowy Targ players
Polish ice hockey centres
TH Unia Oświęcim players
Sportspeople from Lesser Poland Voivodeship